Danielle Stewart (born 29 July 1981 in Brisbane, Queensland) is a softball player from Australia, who won a bronze medal at the 2008 Summer Olympics. A short stop, Stewart plays for the Mariners club in Brisbane and has also played college softball in the US at Hofstra University.

External links
 Australian Olympic Committee profile

1981 births
Australian softball players
Living people
Hofstra Pride softball players
Olympic softball players of Australia
Softball players at the 2008 Summer Olympics
Olympic bronze medalists for Australia
Sportswomen from Queensland
Olympic medalists in softball
Medalists at the 2008 Summer Olympics
People educated at Brisbane State High School
Sportspeople from Brisbane